Dalton may refer to:

Science
 Dalton (crater), a lunar crater
 Dalton (program), chemistry software
 Dalton (unit) (Da), the atomic mass unit
 John Dalton, chemist, physicist and meteorologist

Entertainment
 Dalton (Buffyverse), minor character from Buffy the Vampire Slayer television series
 Dalton (band), Danish musical band
 Dalton (Chrono Trigger), non-playable main character in Chrono Trigger
 The Dalton Brothers (band), a parodistic country band created by U2
 The Daltons (Lucky Luke), fictional outlaws in Lucky Luke comic book series
 Dalton Academy, a fictional school in the TV series Glee
 Dalton Russell, character played by Clive Owen in 2006 film Inside Man
 The Daltons (2010 TV series), a French animated TV series

Places

United Kingdom
 Dalton-le-Dale, County Durham, England
 Dalton-in-Furness, Cumbria (historically in Lancashire), England
 Dalton, Cumbria, near Burton-in-Kendal (historically in Lancashire), England
 Dalton, Dumfries and Galloway, Scotland
 Dalton, Hambleton, North Yorkshire, England
 Dalton, Hexhamshire, a location
 Dalton, Lancashire, near Skelmersdale, England
 Dalton, Northumbria, England
 Dalton, Richmondshire, North Yorkshire, England
 Dalton, South Lanarkshire, a location in Scotland
 Dalton, South Yorkshire, England
 Dalton, Stamfordham, a location
 Dalton, West Yorkshire, England

United States
 Dalton, Georgia
 Dalton Gardens, Idaho
 Dalton City, Illinois
 Dalton, Indiana
 Dalton Township, Wayne County, Indiana
 Dalton, Kansas
 Dalton, Massachusetts
 Dalton Township, Michigan
 Dalton, Minnesota
 Dalton, Missouri
 Dalton, Nebraska
 Dalton, New Hampshire
 Dalton, New York
 Dalton, North Carolina
 Dalton, Ohio
 Dalton, Pennsylvania
 Dalton Creek, a stream in Utah
 Dalton, Wisconsin

Elsewhere
 Dalton, Algoma District, Ontario
 Dalton Township, Ontario
 Dalton, Israel
 Dalton, KwaZulu-Natal, South Africa
 Dalton, New South Wales, Australia

Transportation
 Dalton Airport (Michigan) in Flushing, Michigan, United States
 Dalton Municipal Airport in Dalton, Georgia
 Dalton Highway, in Alaska, United States
 Dalton Trail, a trail between Alaska and Canada
 Dalton station (Ontario), in Canada
 Dalton railway station, in Cumbria, England

Other uses
 Dalton (given name)
 Dalton (surname)
 Dalton Gang, American Old West outlaws
 Dalton Armoury, Scarborough, Ontario, a Canadian Forces facility
 Dalton Barracks, Royal Air Force station near Abingdon, Oxfordshire
 Dalton Castle, Cumbria, in Dalton-in-Furness, Cumbria, England
 Dalton Plan, an educational concept created by Helen Parkhurst
 Dalton School, a private school in New York City
 Dalton State College, one of eight state colleges in the University System of Georgia
 Dalton tradition, a distinctive shape of stone arrowhead
 Dalton Winery, a winery in Israel
 Four Seasons Hotel & Private Residences, One Dalton Street

See also
 Dalton Hall (disambiguation)
 Dalton High School (disambiguation)
 Dalton's law, a thermodynamic law about partial pressures
 D'Alton
 Daulton (disambiguation)